Several German nobleman were called Henry of Berg (German: Heinrich von Berg). They are divided into two families referring to different places named Berg. These are:

 Henry of the County of Berg in Ehingen (later the Margraviate of Burgau)
Henry I, Count of Berg (d. 1115), the second ruler of the Berg-Schelklingen family
Henry II, Count of Berg (d. 1126), son of the previous
 Henry, Bishop of Passau and Würzburg (d. 1193), nephew of the previous
Henry I, Margrave of Burgau (d. 1242), nephew of the previous
Henry II, Margrave of Burgau (d. 1293/1294), son of the previous
Henry III, Margrave of Burgau (d. after 1301), son of the previous
 Henry of the County of Berg in Solingen (later the Duchy of Berg)
Henry IV, Duke of Limburg and Count of Berg (d. 1247), married to the Ezzonid family heiress
 Henry, Lord of Windeck (d. 1290/1296), grandson of the previous
Henry, Canon at Cologne (d. 1310), son of the previous